Nevelle Clarke is an American football cornerback for the New Orleans Breakers of the United States Football League (USFL). He played college football at UCF. He signed with the Minnesota Vikings as an undrafted free agent in 2020.

High school career 
Clarke played wide receiver, cornerback, safety, and returner at J. P. Taravella High School.

College career 
As a redshirt freshman, Clarke was named to the 2016–17 American All-Academic Team after recording fifteen tackles and two pass breakups.

In his redshirt junior season, he was named to the All-ACC First-team after recording forty-six total tackles, thirteen pass breakups, and two interceptions.

On January 9, 2019, Clark announced he would stay at UCF for his senior season.

Clarke played in the 2020 East-West Shrine Bowl on January 18, 2020.

Professional career
Nevelle Clarke was invited to the NFL Scouting Combine, where he had a solid performance. Although, Clarke ultimately went undrafted.

Minnesota Vikings
Clarke soon signed with the Minnesota Vikings as an undrafted free agent on April 27, 2020. He was placed on the active/non-football injury list at the start of training camp on July 28, 2020, and moved back to the active roster three days later. He was waived by the Vikings during final roster cuts on September 5, 2020.

New Orleans Breakers
Clarke signed with the New Orleans Breakers of the United States Football League on April 1, 2022. He was transferred to the team's inactive roster on May 12 with a hamstring injury.

Personal life 
Clarke was born in Miami, Florida, to Norman Clarke and Regina Boston.

References 

Living people
Players of American football from Miami
J. P. Taravella High School alumni
UCF Knights football players
Minnesota Vikings players
New Orleans Breakers (2022) players
1996 births